Acupalpus gracilis is an insect-eating ground beetle of the genus Acupalpus.

gracilis
Beetles described in 1848